St. Matthias' Church, Nottingham, was a Church of England church in Sneinton, Nottingham, between 1868 and 2003.

It is a Grade II listed building.

Anglican Church

It was designed by Thomas Chambers Hine and Robert Evans. It was consecrated as a chapel of ease in the parish of St. Stephen's Church, Sneinton by The Rt. Revd. John Jackson the Bishop of Lincoln on 6 May 1868. It was built for the sum of £3,000. (equivalent to £ in ),.

The chancel was damaged by enemy action during the Second World War.

Anglican incumbents

1869-1882 Frederick Armine Wodehouse 
1882-1890 Arthur Powys Woodhouse 
1890-1892 George Perry-Gore 
1892-1900 William Henry Castell Malton 
1900-1903 William Walker 
1903-1904 Anonymous
1904-1912 Ralph Mowbray Howard 
1912-1931 John Henry Tomlinson 
1931-1954 Frederick Llewellyn Forsaith Rees 
1955-1990 Kenneth Leigh Bennett 
1990-1993 William Albert Porter 
1994-2002 Rodney Frederic Brittain Smith
2003- Malcolm Crook

Organ

The three manual organ was by E. Wragg & Son dating from 1912. A specification of the organ can be found on the National Pipe Organ Register.

Organists
E. Stevenson ???? - 1883

Coptic Orthodox Church

In 2006 the building was sold to the Coptic Orthodox Diocese of the Midlands and is now St Mary and St George's Coptic Orthodox Church.

References

External links
Detailed history of the church on the Southwell Diocesan Church History project
St. Mary & St. George's Coptic Orthodox Church

Sneinton St. Matthias
Nottingham, St Matthias
Churches bombed by the Luftwaffe in Nottingham
Nottingham
Thomas Chambers Hine buildings
Churches completed in 1868
Christian organizations disestablished in 2003